Kyaw Swar Win is a Burmese politician who currently serves as a Pyithu Hluttaw MP for the Katha Township Constituency.

Political career

In the 2015 Myanmar general election, he was elected as a Sagaing Region Hluttaw MP and elected representative for the Katha Township No. 1 parliamentary constituency.

In the 2020 Myanmar general election, he was elected as a Pyithu Hluttaw MP and elected representative for the Katha Township parliamentary constituency.

References

Living people
People from Sagaing Region
1984 births